Chengjiao (256–239 BC), titled Lord of Chang'an, was the son of King Zhuangxiang of Qin and the paternal half-brother of Qin Shi Huang. After Ying Zheng inherited the title of King of Qin from his father King Zhuangxiang, Chengjiao rebelled at Tunliu and surrendered to the State of Zhao. King Daoxiang of Zhao granted him the territory of Rao (modern Raoyang County, Hebei). In 239 BC, Qin forces occupied Rao and he was killed.

Potential betrayal
There are disputes on whether he actually betrayed Qin for such a small land as Rao, as indicated that he did not suffer the punishment of dismemberment as Pu Gu (蒲鶮), a captain of sorts of the traitors in Tunliu.

Family
Some historians, including Li Kaiyuan and Ma Feibai, hypothesize that Ziying, the last king of Qin, may be his son.

In popular culture

In Kingdom, he launched a coup that tried to kill Qin Shi Huang alongside his own faction. He was later overthrown by Lord Changwen, Xin, loyalists and the mountain tribes. He was later pardoned and allowed leadership during Qin Shi Huang's campaigns. He was also appointed leader during a border war, but torn when the city he expected to be defended, rebelled. He was later killed by a rebel commander after being cornered, using him as an excuse to foment distrust to his brother.

He also appeared as an enemy of Qin Shi Huang and the protagonist Xiang Shaolong (項少龍) in Huang Yi's novel  and its live action TV series (2001 and ), game and comics adaptations.

References

Qin state people